London in the Raw is a 1964 British documentary about London nightlife. It was inspired by the success of Mondo Cane.

Reception
According to Tony Tenser, the film recouped its cost within six months of release.

It was followed by a sequel Primitive London a year later.

References

External links

London in the Raw at BFI

1964 films
1964 documentary films
British documentary films
Documentary films about London
Films directed by Norman Cohen
Films scored by Basil Kirchin
1960s English-language films
1960s British films